The Three Rivers Convention Center is the convention center for the Tri-Cities of south-eastern Washington, United States. It gets its name from the Snake River, Yakima River, and Columbia River, all of which intersect in the general area of the Tri-Cities. It is located in western Kennewick, adjacent to the Toyota Center, and opened in 2004.

Early proposals for a convention center in the Tri-Cities emerged in the late 1970s, with the three principal cities of the area competing to attract a potential suitor. The initial plan for the Tri-Cities Coliseum (now Toyota Center) in the 1980s included an adjacent convention center, but it was not realized for several decades.

References

External links
 Oficial website

Kennewick, Washington
Convention centers in Washington (state)
Buildings and structures in Benton County, Washington
Tourist attractions in Benton County, Washington
Tri-Cities, Washington
2004 establishments in Washington (state)